Eupithecia garuda is a moth in the family Geometridae. It is found in Nepal, India (West Bengal), Laos and Thailand.

The wingspan is about 16.5 mm. The forewings are dark brown with clear grey transverse lines. The hindwings are grey with five or six darker transverse bands.

References

Moths described in 2005
garuda
Moths of Asia